Lusówko  is a village in the administrative district of Gmina Tarnowo Podgórne, within Poznań County, Greater Poland Voivodeship, in west-central Poland.

Since 2016 in Lusowko there is private Lusowko Platanus Observatory (IAU code K80), dealing with astronomical observations of Solar system minor planets and astronomy popularization.

The village has a population of 2,108 (2017-12-31).

References

Villages in Poznań County